Canarias was a Canarias-class heavy cruiser of the Spanish Navy. She was built in Spain by the Vickers-Armstrongs subsidiary Sociedad Española de Construcción Naval based on a British design, being a modified version of the Royal Navy′s County class. Canarias saw service during the Spanish Civil War.

History
Canarias was the flagship of the Nationalist Navy and sank 34 ships, including the Spanish Republican Navy destroyer  during the Battle of Cape Espartel, and the Soviet merchant Komsomol off Oran, both in the second half of 1936. Canarias was the main player of the Battle of Cape Machichaco on 5 March 1937, when the Basque Auxiliary Navy naval trawler Nabarra was destroyed. She also damaged the destroyer , forcing her to seek refuge at Gibraltar on 29 August 1938. Canarias captured the Republican liner Mar Cantábrico, which was later converted to an auxiliary cruiser.

The cruiser remained in commission (due to several repair and refit periods) as the fleet flagship throughout her career. A major refit was planned for Canarias around 1973 to further extend the vessel's life, but a survey of her condition (conducted with help of US Navy personnel) concluded she was too old and obsolete to warrant the work. Some effort was made to turn her into a museum ship, but very little funds were raised for the plan.  She was decommissioned in 1975 and then sold for scrap in 1977, but was able to steam under her own power to the scrapyard.

Notes

References

External links

 Canarias, Adiós by Willard C. Frank, Jr. (1975)
 Crucero Canarias (C-21). Última singladura. 1974 (Decommissioning ceremony of Spanish cruiser Canarias) (YouTube)

Canarias-class cruisers
Ships built in Spain
1931 ships
Military units and formations of the Spanish Civil War
Maritime incidents in 1936